Hinnamnor may refer to:

 Hin Namno National Park, also known as Hinnamnor National Protected Area, in Boualapha District, Khammouane Province, Laos
 Typhoon Hinnamnor, a super typhoon in the Northwestern Pacific Ocean in 2022